Toy Boy is a Spanish drama produced by Atresmedia and Plano a Plano. The show stars Jesús Mosquera, Cristina Castaño and María Pedraza. It premiered first on FesTVal and Atresplayer Premium in September 2019 before its premiere on Antena 3 on 25 September 2019.

Plot 
The fiction is set in the Costa del Sol. Hugo Beltrán (Jesús Mosquera) is a young, handsome and carefree stripper. One morning he wakes up on a sailboat, after a night of partying and excesses, next to the burned corpse of a man, allegedly the husband of his lover, Macarena Medina (Cristina Castaño), a mature and powerful woman with whom he maintained a steamy high-voltage sexual relationship. Hugo does not remember anything that happened the night of the crime, but he is sure that he is not the murderer, but the victim of a set-up to accuse him. After a quick trial, he is sentenced to fifteen years in prison.

Seven years later, he is visited in prison by Triana Marín (María Pedraza), a young lawyer who, representing a major law firm, offers to help him reopen the case and try to prove his innocence in a new trial. Although Hugo distrusts the offer, Triana gets the conviction annulled and Hugo is released from prison, on probation and pending the holding of a new trial in which they will have to be able to prove their innocence.

Triana and Hugo work together to try to unravel a complex plot that took an innocent person to prison. A relationship that will not be easy, since they belong to diametrically opposite worlds; She is a lawyer with a hard-working, responsible and bright future. He, a master of the night, former prisoner and considered a murderer by everyone except himself.

Cast 
 Jesús Mosquera as Hugo Beltrán González
 Cristina Castaño as Macarena Medina de Solís
 María Pedraza as Triana Marín
 José de la Torre as Iván
 Carlo Costanzia as Jairo Soto
 Raudel Raúl Martiato as Germán
 Juanjo Almeida as Andrea Norman Medina
  as Borja Medina de Solís
  as Mateo Medina de Solís
  as Ángel Altamira
 Pedro Casablanc as Inspector Mario Zapata
  as María Teresa Rojas
 María Pujalte as Carmen de Andrés
 Adelfa Calvo as Doña Benigna Rojas Romero
 Carlos Scholz as Óscar
 Nía Castro as Claudia
 Miriam Díaz-Aroca as Luisa García
 Cinta Ramírez as Lucía
 Virgil Mathet as Philip Norman
Introduced in season 2
 Álex González as El Turco
  as Rania

Episodes

Series overview

Season 1  (2019)

Season 2

Production and release 
Created by César Benítez, Juan Carlos Cueto and Rocío Martínez, Toy Boy was produced by Atresmedia Televisión in collaboration with Plano a Plano. Iñaki Mercero and Javier Quintas directed the episodes of the first season. The first season was shot on natural locations of the Costa del Sol: shooting locations included Málaga, Fuengirola, Torremolinos, Mijas, Marbella and Estepona. Filming was wrapped in May 2019. The series premiered on Atresplayer Premium on 8 September 2019, later starting its free-to-air broadcasting run on Antena 3 on 25 September 2019.

Despite mediocre viewership figures in the domestic run on linear television, the series enjoyed a better international reception in Netflix. Thus, in July 2020, Atresmedia and Netflix decided to bring back the series for a second season. Filming started by March 2021 in Vélez-Málaga. In April 2021 Álex González, Federica Sabatini, Enrique Arce, Paco Marín, Ibrahim Al-Shami, Toni Zenet and Juan Betancourt were announced as additions to the cast, with Javier Quintas and Laura M. Campos as directors. Atresplayer Premium set the season 2 premiere date for 26 September 2021.

Season 2 was aired on Netflix on 11 February 2022.

References

External links 
 

2019 Spanish television series debuts
Atresplayer Premium original programming
Spanish-language television shows
Spanish LGBT-related television shows
Television shows set in Andalusia
2010s Spanish drama television series
Television shows filmed in Spain
Spanish thriller television series
2020s Spanish drama television series
Television series by Plano a Plano